Just Margo is a studio album by American country music artist Margo Smith. It was released in October 1979 via Warner Bros. Records and contained 12 tracks. It was the seventh studio release in Smith's music career and spawned two singles: "Baby My Baby" and "The Shuffle Song" (the latter of which became the highest-peaking chart hit). The album itself reached peak positions on national publication charts following its release.

Background and content
By 1979, Margo Smith had two number one singles on the American country charts with the songs "Don't Break the Heart That Loves You" and "It Only Hurts for a Little While." Following this, she adopted a "sexier" image and had hits that further defined this new persona, such as "Still a Woman." Her new image transitioned into 1979 album release, Just Margo, which featured Smith wearing a satin bathrobe on the cover. Just Margo was recorded between June and July 1979 at the Columbia Recording Studio, located in Nashville, Tennessee. The sessions were produced by Norro Wilson, who had been collaborating with Smith since her first studio release with Warner Bros. Records in 1976. Just Margo contained twelve tracks, five of which were composed by Smith herself. It also included covers of previously-recorded material, such as Kris Kristofferson's "I'd Rather Be Sorry" and Janis Ian's "Jesse."

Release and chart performance
Just Margo was released in October 1979 on Warner Bros. Records. The project marked the seventh studio album of Smith's music career. The album was issued as a vinyl LP, containing six songs on either side of the record. It was also offered as a cassette with an identical track listing. The album peaked at number 14 on the Canadian RPM Country Albums chart. It was her highest-peaking LP on the chart and her final-charting LP to reach such a position. Just Margo also spawned two singles. The first single was released in August 1979, which was titled "Baby My Baby". The song climbed to number 27 on the Billboard Hot Country Songs chart later that year.  

According to an article from Billboard magazine, the track "He's Lying" was being considered as the album's second single. However, "The Shuffle Song" was issued as the album's second single, in November 1979. The song reached number 13 on the same country chart in 1980. It became Smith's final top 20 single on that chart. Both singles also reached charting positions on the RPM Country Songs chart, with "The Shuffle Song" peaking at number 21.

Track listing

Vinyl and cassette versions

Personnel
All credits are adapted from the liner notes of Just Margo.

Musical personnel

 Tommy Allsup – Tic tac bass
 David Briggs – Keyboards
 Tommy Cogbill – Bass
 Ray Edenton – Rhythm guitar
 Sonny Garrish – Steel guitar
 Steve Gibson – Rhythm guitar
 Robert Hajacos – Fiddle
 Sheri Kramer – Background vocals
 The Shelly Kurland Strings – Strings
 Larrie Londin – Drums
 Kenny Malone – Drums
 Bill Puett – Horn
 Billy Sanford – Guitar

 Lisa Silver – Background vocals
 Don Sheffiled – Horn
 Margo Smith – Lead vocals
 Buddy Spicher – Fiddle
 Henry Strzelecki – Bass
 Diane Tidwell – Background vocals
 Pete Wade – Rhythm guitar
 Reggie Young – Guitar

Technical personnel
 Lou Bradley – Engineering
 Farrell Morris – Percussion
 Bergen White – String arrangement
 Norro Wilson – Producer

Charts

Release history

References

1979 albums
Albums produced by Norro Wilson
Margo Smith albums
Warner Records albums